Sophie Cluzel (born 7 January 1961) is a French politician of La République En Marche! (LREM) who served as the Secretary of State in charge of People with Disabilities in the governments of successive Prime Ministers Édouard Philippe and Jean Castex from 2017 to 2022.

Early career
Early in her career, Cluzel was the founder of various associations for the education of disabled children, including the SAIS 92 collective and the association Grandir à l'école (Growing up at school), an initiative dedicated to children with Down syndrome.

Cluzel served as president of the National Federation of Associations Serving Students with Disabilities and as administrator of the National Union of Associations of Parents to Mentally Handicapped Persons and their Friends (UNAPEI) from 2011 to 2013.

Political career
For the 2021 regional elections, Cluzel was nominated as LREM's candidate to become President of the Regional Council of Provence-Alpes-Côte d'Azur. Following an agreement between LREM and the Republicans (LR), she later ran on same ticket led by LR's Renaud Muselier, the incumbent president of the Regional Council.

Personal life
Cluzel is married to a nephew of Jean Cluzel.

References

1961 births
Living people
21st-century French politicians
Government ministers of France
Women government ministers of France
21st-century French women politicians
Politicians from Marseille
Officiers of the Légion d'honneur